Lieutenant-General Joseph Paul André Deschamps, CMM, CD, usually André Deschamps or J P A Deschamps, was Chief of the Air Staff and then Commander of the Royal Canadian Air Force between 2009 and 2012.

Career
Deschamps joined the Canadian Forces in 1977, and completed pilot training the following year.  As a junior officer Deschamps carried out instructor duties on the Musketeer trainer.  He later flew the CF-104 Starfighter in Europe during the Cold War.

Deschamps served as the Commanding Officer of Squadron 2, NATO Air Base Geilenkirchen, Germany, and became Commanding Officer of 8 Wing Trenton in 2004, and then commanded the Theatre Support Element (Camp Mirage) in support of Operation Athena in Afghanistan. He was appointed Chief of Staff - Operations of Canadian Expeditionary Force Command in 2006, Assistant Chief of the Air Staff in June 2008 and Chief of the Air Staff in October 2009.  It was during his tenure that Air Command was renamed the "Royal Canadian Air Force".

Honours

  He was a qualified RCAF Pilot and as such wore the Royal Air Canadian Forces Pilot Wings.

Notes

References

|-

|-

|-

Commanders of the Order of Military Merit (Canada)
Royal Canadian Air Force generals
Canadian Forces Air Command generals
Living people
20th-century Canadian military personnel
21st-century Canadian military personnel
Year of birth missing (living people)